Gayton is a civil parish in the Borough of Stafford, Staffordshire, England.  It contains two listed buildings that are recorded in the National Heritage List for England. Of these, one is at Grade II*, the middle of the three grades, and the other is at Grade II, the lowest grade.  The parish contains the village of Gayton and the surrounding countryside, and the listed buildings consist of a church and a farmhouse.


Key

Buildings

References

Citations

Sources

Lists of listed buildings in Staffordshire